Criollos de Caguas were a professional basketball team based in Caguas, Puerto Rico.

History
The Criollos professional basketball team began to play during the 1969 season, joining their counterparts the Criollos of baseball. Unlike their baseball counterparts, however, the basketball Criollos did not enjoy a wild and steady success, instead settling for moderate success. 

The Criollos, with Cayey's resident Willie Melendez and Bayamon-born Willie Quiñones on their side, reached the semi-finals in 1985. Melendez was traded to the Polluelos de Aibonito the following season, however, and The Criollos then went on a downward spiral, going 12–21 in 1986, 7–23 in 1987, 9–24 in 1988 and 10–20 in 1989. Quinones, although the Criollos only once posted a winning record with him as a player, always refused to be traded as he declared over and over again that he would only play for his hometown's team. He and Melendez (Melendez with 6,123) are members of the exclusive group of basketball players that have scored 5,000 or more points in Puerto Rican basketball history, 5,000 points being a coveted number because of the relatively small number of games played each year (from 30 to 33 games per season).

In 1987, Caguas Mayor Angel O. Berrios took over as team owner. In the 1990s, a Criollos revival began, and he hired such players as Luis Allende and Gary Joe Burgos. The Criollos reached the semi-finals again in 2002, and got to the playoffs in 2003, losing in the first round.

The Criollos decided not to play during the 2005 BSN season, partly because of economical reasons, but the team returned for the 2006 season and won the tournament for the first time in their history after beating the Cangrejeros de Santurce in the finals.

The Criollos entered the league's "Super 6" semifinals. They remained with possibilities of earning advancing until the final stages of the phase, gathering 20 points. On June 10, 2008, one of the team's games against the Arecibo Captains was cancelled when the league suspected that one of the Captains' players was playing against the league's rules.

References

External links
Puerto Rican League official website 

BSN teams
Caguas, Puerto Rico
1976 establishments in Puerto Rico
Basketball teams established in 1969